Charles Henry Dees (born June 24, 1935) is a retired American professional baseball player whose career extended from 1957 through 1966. The first baseman appeared in 98 games played in Major League Baseball over parts of three seasons (1963–65) for the Los Angeles/California Angels.

Dees was born in Birmingham, Alabama. He played for the Louisville Clippers of the Negro leagues in 1957 before signing with the San Francisco Giants' organization the following year. He batted over .300 in three of his first five minor league seasons, culminating with a breakout year for the 1962 El Paso Sun Kings of the Double-A Texas League. Dees led the Texas circuit in batting (.348) and hits (179), and reached career highs in home runs (23) and runs batted in (115). He was selected as a member of the Texas League all-star team. The following March, the Giants sold his contract to the Angels.

Dees split  between the big-league Angels and their Triple-A affiliate, the Hawaii Islanders, and batted over .300 at both levels. In his MLB debut, May 26 at Dodger Stadium, he doubled off Orlando Peña of the Kansas City Athletics in his first at bat, driving home baserunner Billy Moran for his first big-league run batted in.

Then Dees embarked on a torrid stretch at the plate. Over his first 20 games, he batted .382 and took over the Angels' starting first base job. But in the middle of June, his hot hitting began to cool. During a 4-for-35 drought that lasted into early July, his average fell below .300 and he was sent back to Hawaii at month's end, batting .281. Recalled to Los Angeles in September, however, he enjoyed another hot stretch, particularly against the Boston Red Sox. Dees started ten games between September 9 and 28, and put up six multi-hit contests, with four three-hit games. Three of those came against Boston, against whom he went 11-for-21 (.524). He finished his rookie year at .307 in 60 games for the Angels.

But Dees'  season was disastrous. He began the year as a pinch hitter and started only three games for the Angels in almost two months. Worse, he collected only two hits and one base on balls in 28 plate appearances, and was batting .077 when the Angels loaned Dees to the Houston Colt .45s' top affiliate, the Oklahoma City 89ers, where he played the rest of the season and batted only .257.  The Angels retained his rights, however, and in  optioned him to the Triple-A Seattle Angels and then to the Double-A Sun Kings, which was now an Angels' affiliate. Back in the hitting-friendly confines of El Paso, three years after his strong 1962 campaign for the Sun Kings, the 30-year-old Dees batted .377 and earned a last call-up to the Angels in September. But his struggles continued: he hit only .156 in 12 games.

Dees split 1966 between Triple-A and Double-A before leaving baseball.

In his three seasons with the Angels, Dees batted .265. His 69 hits included 12 doubles, one triple and three home runs.

References

External links

1935 births
Living people
African-American baseball players
Baseball players from Birmingham, Alabama
California Angels players
Corpus Christi Giants players
El Paso Sun Kings players
Hawaii Islanders players
Los Angeles Angels players
Major League Baseball first basemen
Oklahoma City 89ers players
Portland Beavers players
Seattle Angels players
Springfield Giants players
Tacoma Giants players
21st-century African-American people
20th-century African-American sportspeople